Best Newcomer is an award category. It may refer to:

 Asian Film Award for Best Newcomer
 BAFTA Award for Most Promising Newcomer to Leading Film Roles
 British Soap Award for Best Newcomer
 Empire Award for Best Female Newcomer
 Empire Award for Best Male Newcomer
 Empire Award for Best Newcomer
 Star Awards for Best Newcomer